Island Officials, located in Woodbury, New Jersey, is a computer game developer founded in 2007 by Ryan Morrison and Ryan Harbinson. The company is responsible for the Hands On! game franchise. Island Officials won the Atari Community Choice Award for their entry, Pong EVO, in Atari's Pong Indie Developer Challenge.

External links
Island Officials website

 

Video game companies of the United States
Video game development companies
American companies established in 2007